|}

The St Leger Stakes is a Group 1 flat horse race in Great Britain open to three-year-old thoroughbred colts and fillies. It is run at Doncaster over a distance of 1 mile, 6 furlongs and 115 yards (2,921 metres), and it is scheduled to take place each year in September.

Established in 1776, the St Leger is the oldest of Britain's five Classics. It is the last of the five to be run each year, and its distance is longer than any of the other four.

The St Leger is the final leg of the English Triple Crown, which begins with the 2000 Guineas and continues with the Derby. It also completes the Fillies' Triple Crown, following on from the 1000 Guineas and the Oaks. The St Leger has rarely featured Triple Crown contenders in recent decades, with the only one in recent years being the 2012 2,000 Guineas and Derby winner Camelot, who finished second in the St Leger.

History

Early years
The event was devised by Anthony St Leger, an army officer and politician who lived near Doncaster. It was initially referred to as "A Sweepstake of 25 Guineas", and its original distance was two miles. The rules stipulated that colts and geldings were to carry 8 st, and fillies would receive an allowance of 2 lb.

The inaugural running was held at Cantley Common on 24 September 1776. The first winner was an unnamed filly owned by the event's organiser, the 2nd Marquess of Rockingham. The filly was later named Allabaculia.

The title St Leger Stakes was decided at a dinner party held in 1778 at the Red Lion Inn located in the Market Place, Doncaster, to discuss the coming year's race. It was suggested that it should be called the Rockingham Stakes in honour of the host, the Marquess of Rockingham, but the Marquess proposed that it should be named instead after Anthony St Leger. That year the event was moved to its present location, Town Moor, in 1778.

The race came to national prominence in 1800, when a horse called Champion registered the first Derby–St Leger double. Its length was cut to 1 mile, 6 furlongs and 193 yards in 1813, and despite some minor alterations has remained much the same ever since. The victory of West Australian in 1853 completed the first success in the Triple Crown.

Post-1900
The St Leger Stakes was closed to geldings in 1906. It was transferred to Newmarket during World War I, and the substitute event was called the September Stakes. It was cancelled in 1939 because of the outbreak of World War II, and the following year's edition was held at Thirsk in November. For the remainder of this period it was staged at Manchester (1941), Newmarket (1942–44) and York (1945).

The race was switched to Ayr in 1989 after the scheduled running at Doncaster was abandoned due to subsidence. The 2006 race took place at York because its regular venue was closed for redevelopment.

The St Leger Stakes has inspired a number of similar events around the world, although many are no longer restricted to three-year-olds. European variations include the Irish St. Leger, the Prix Royal-Oak, the Deutsches St. Leger and the St. Leger Italiano. Other national equivalents include the Kikuka-shō, the New Zealand St. Leger and the VRC St Leger.

Records
Leading jockey (9 wins):
 Bill Scott – Jack Spigot (1821), Memnon (1825), The Colonel (1828), Rowton (1829), Don John (1838), Charles the Twelfth (1839), Launcelot (1840), Satirist (1841), Sir Tatton Sykes (1846)

Leading trainer (16 wins):
 John Scott – Matilda (1827), The Colonel (1828), Rowton (1829), Margrave (1832), Touchstone (1834), Don John (1838), Charles the Twelfth (1839), Launcelot (1840), Satirist (1841), The Baron (1845), Newminster (1851), West Australian (1853), Warlock (1856), Imperieuse (1857), Gamester (1859), The Marquis (1862)

Leading owner (7 wins):
 Archibald Hamilton, 9th Duke of Hamilton – Paragon (1786), Spadille (1787), Young Flora (1788), Tartar (1792), Petronius (1808), Ashton (1809), William (1814)
 Fastest winning time (at Doncaster) – Logician (2019), 3m 00.27s
 Widest winning margin – Never Say Die (1954), 12 lengths
 Longest odds winner – Theodore (1822), 200/1
 Shortest odds winner – Galtee More (1897), 1/10
 Most runners – 30, in 1825
 Fewest runners – 3, in 1917

Winners

In popular culture
As the last of the classics, the race marks the end of summer in England. The popular adage "sell in May and go away, come back on St Leger Day" suggests investors should sell their shares in May and buy again after the race.

The Agatha Christie novel The A.B.C. Murders has the St Leger as a plot point near the end of the novel.

See also
 Horse racing in Great Britain
 List of British flat horse races

References

 Racing Post:

 galopp-sieger.de – St. Leger Stakes.
 horseracinghistory.co.uk – St. Leger.
 ifhaonline.org – International Federation of Horseracing Authorities – St. Leger (2019).
 pedigreequery.com – St. Leger Stakes – Doncaster.
 tbheritage.com – St. Leger Stakes.

Bibliography

 Ruffs Guide to the Turf, Winter Edition, 1920

Flat races in Great Britain
Doncaster Racecourse
Flat horse races for three-year-olds
Triple Crown of Thoroughbred Racing
Recurring sporting events established in 1776
1776 establishments in England
British Champions Series
September sporting events